Timothy H. Osmond (January 12, 1949 – December 17, 2002) was an American politician and businessman.

Born in Sycamore, Illinois, Osmond received his bachelor's degree from Western Illinois University and was in the insurance business in Antioch, Illinois. Osmond served in the Antioch Township government and was a Republican. Osmond served in the Illinois House of Representatives from 1999 until his death, in Antioch, Illinois, from a heart attack. His wife JoAnn also served in the Illinois House of Representatives.

Notes

1949 births
2002 deaths
People from Antioch, Illinois
People from Sycamore, Illinois
Western Illinois University alumni
Businesspeople from Illinois
Republican Party members of the Illinois House of Representatives
20th-century American politicians
20th-century American businesspeople